Naugatuck may refer to:

Connecticut, U.S.
Naugatuck, Connecticut
Naugatuck River
Naugatuck River Valley
Naugatuck Trail
Naugatuck Railroad
Naugatuck State Forest
Naugatuck High School
Naugatuck (Metro-North station)

West Virginia, U.S.
Naugatuck, West Virginia

Ships
USRC Naugatuck, a steamer owned by the US Revenue Cutter Service during the American Civil War
USS Naugatuck, the name of several ships
SS Tarpon (shipwreck), originally known as the Naugatuck

Other uses
Mrs. Nell Naugatuck, character in Maude (TV series)